Urodeta acerba is a moth of the family Elachistidae. It is found in the Democratic Republic of the Congo.

The wingspan is 4.7–5.4 mm. The thorax, tegula and forewing are grey brown, mottled with blackish brown tipped scales. The hindwings are very narrow and grey brown. Adults have been recorded in March and May.

Etymology
The species name is derived from the Latin acerbus (meaning gloomy, dark) and refers to the dark coloration of moth.

References

Elachistidae
Moths described in 2011
Insects of the Democratic Republic of the Congo
Moths of Africa
Endemic fauna of the Democratic Republic of the Congo